The white-bibbed babbler (Stachyris thoracica) is a species of bird in the family Timaliidae. It is found in Bali and Java.

Its natural habitats are subtropical or tropical moist lowland forest and subtropical or tropical moist montane forest.

References

Collar, N. J. & Robson, C. 2007. Family Timaliidae (Babblers)  pp. 70 – 291 in; del Hoyo, J., Elliott, A. & Christie, D.A. eds. Handbook of the Birds of the World, Vol. 12. Picathartes to Tits and Chickadees. Lynx Edicions, Barcelona.

white-bibbed babbler
Birds of Bali
Birds of Java
white-bibbed babbler
Taxonomy articles created by Polbot